Rahat Fateh Ali Khan (Punjabi,  ; born 9 December 1974) is a Pakistani Singer, primarily of Qawwali, a form of Sufi devotional music. Khan is one of the biggest and highest paid singers in Pakistan. He is the nephew of Nusrat Fateh Ali Khan, son of Farrukh Fateh Ali Khan and grandson of Qawwali singer Fateh Ali Khan. In addition to Qawwali, he also performs ghazals and other light music. He is also popular as a playback singer in Hindi cinema and the Pakistan film industry.

Early life
Rahat was born into a Punjabi family of Qawwals and classical singers in Faisalabad, Punjab, Pakistan. He is the son of Farrukh Fateh Ali Khan, grandson of Fateh Ali Khan and the nephew of legendary Qawwali singer Nusrat Fateh Ali Khan.

Rahat displayed an adoration for music from a very young age and was often found to be singing with his uncle and father, as young as three. From an age of seven, he was already being trained by his uncle Nusrat Fateh Ali Khan in the art of singing Qawwali.

Career
Rahat performed publicly for the first time, when he was nine, at the death anniversary of his grandfather. Since he was fifteen, he was an integral part of Nusrat Fateh Ali Khan's well-known qawwali group and toured the UK with his uncle in 1985. He also performed solo songs at different concerts, in addition to fulfilling his roles in the Quawalli group.

He debuted as a playback singer in Bollywood with the movie Paap (2003), in the song "Mann Ki Lagan".

In April 2012 Rahat toured in the UK, performing at Wembley Arena and the Manchester Arena, playing to a combined audience of over 20,000 people and creating a record of maximum ticket-sales.

The song "Zaroori Tha" from the album Back 2 Love (2014) became the first original non-film music video from the Indian subcontinent to cross 100 million views on YouTube after two years, and 200 million views within three years of its release. Eventually it reached to 1 Billion views. He is also touring with Leo Twins from Nescafé Basement on a regular basis.

Soundtracks and collaboration
In a subordinate role with his uncle Nusrat Fateh Ali Khan, working in collaboration with Eddie Vedder, of the American rock band, Pearl Jam, Rahat contributed to the soundtrack of the 1995 Hollywood film, Dead Man Walking. In 2002, he worked on the soundtrack of The Four Feathers in collaboration with the American composer of orchestral and film music, James Horner. In 2002, Rahat guested with The Derek Trucks Band on the song "Maki Madni" for Trucks' album, Joyful Noise. In 2006, his vocals were featured on the soundtrack of Mel Gibson's Apocalypto.

Television
He judged the show, Chhote Ustaad alongside Sonu Nigam. He was also one of the judges on the singing reality show Junoon, premiered on NDTV Imagine in 2008.

Nobel Peace Prize Concert
Rahat became the first Pakistani to perform at any Nobel Prize concert, when he was invited to the concert at 2014 Nobel Peace Prize ceremony. He performed Nusrat Fateh Ali Khan's most memorable qawwali "Tumhe Dillagi" and "Mast Qalandar", and he also sang "Aao Parhao" there.

Musical shows

Coke Studio
Rahat has appeared in five editions of the Pakistani musical show Coke Studio.

He first appeared in season 1, where he collaborated with singer Ali Azmat for the track "Garaj Baras". He then collaborated with Abida Parveen in season 7 for "Chhaap Tilak Sab Chheeni".

In season 9, he sang "Afreen Afreen" along with Momina Mustehsan which has garnered more than 300 million views on YouTube, becoming the first Pakistani song to cross that mark. He collaborated with Amjad Sabri for "Aaj Rang Hai", which was the final performance of the latter, prior to his assassination on 22 June 2016.

He appeared in Coke Studio Pakistan (season 10) where he performed "Sayonee" with Ali Noor and a solo number called Rangreza. Rahat's latest appearance in Coke Studio was in Coke Studio 2020 where he performed "Dil Tarpe" featuring Zara Madani.

MTV Unplugged
Rahat had appeared in MTV Unplugged (India) in 2016.

Discography

Awards and nominations

Controversy 
In 2018, the daughter of Nusrat Fateh Ali Khan said she intended to take legal action against copyright infringement of singers who sing her father's songs. To this Rahat responded saying he was the adopted successor of Nusrat and doesn't need anyone's permission to sing his songs.

In January 2019, Khan was accused of smuggling foreign currency and summoned by the Enforcement Directorate (ED) of Government of India.

See also
Dildar Hussain
List of Pakistani musicians

References

External links

 
 
 

 
Filmi singers
1974 births
Bollywood playback singers
Living people
People from Faisalabad
Punjabi people
Pakistani male singers
Pakistani playback singers
Pakistani qawwali singers
Pakistani world music musicians
Singers from Faisalabad
Punjabi-language singers
Urdu-language singers
Urdu playback singers
Pakistani qawwali groups
Rahat
Pakistani tenors
Filmfare Awards winners
Screen Awards winners
International Indian Film Academy Awards winners